The Zuozuo Formation is located in Ritu County inside the Tibet Autonomous 
Region. It has been dated to the Late Permian period.

References

Geologic formations of Asia
Geology of Tibet
Permian System of Asia